Wu Cheng'en and Journey to the West is a Chinese television series about the life of Wu Cheng'en and his inspiration for writing the 16th-century novel Journey to the West. The series was directed by Kan Weiping and consists of a total of 45 episodes shot in high definition, each 45 minutes long and containing 10 minutes of 3-D effects. The original lead actors of the 1986 television series Journey to the West starred in Wu Cheng'en and Journey to the West and reprised their roles: Liu Xiao Ling Tong as Sun Wukong, Chi Chongrui as Tang Sanzang and Ma Dehua as Zhu Bajie. Sha Wujing, however, was portrayed by Liu Dagang because the original actor, Yan Huaili, died in April 2009. It was broadcast by Shandong Qilu TV in July 2010.

Cast
 Liu Xiao Ling Tong as Wu Cheng'en / Sun Wukong
 Chi Chongrui as Tang Sanzang
 Ma Dehua as Yao Laoda / Zhu Bajie
 Liu Dagang as Chen Long / Sha Wujing
 Li Wenying as Ye Yun / Chang'e
 Yang Zi as young Ye Yun
 Ma Su as Niu Yufeng / Lotus Fairy
 Shi Xiaoqun as Bai Xueyan / Huang Su'e / Ruler of Women's Country
 Sun Tao as Shen Kun
 Niu Ben as Li Laofuzi
 Zheng Shuang as Wu Chengjia
 Xue Yong as Luo Wanjin
 Shang Daqing as Luo Pang
 Xie Yunshan as young Luo Pang
 Liu Jia as Guanyin
 Zhu Longguang as Monk Huifang / Buddha
 Wang Weiguo as Jiajing Emperor / Jade Emperor
 Tian Lianyuan as storyteller
 Jin Yang as Li Chunfang
 Guan Shaozeng as Wu Rui
 Xu Jingyi as Luo residence housekeeper
 Cao Li as Yan Song
 Zong Fengyan as Zhu Zaihou
 Qi Wenyao as Gui Youguang

See also
 List of media adaptations of Journey to the West

References

2010 Chinese television series debuts
Television shows based on Journey to the West
2010 Chinese television series endings